More of the Best of Bill Cosby (1970) is the 13th album by Bill Cosby.

It is his second compilation album containing favorites from his tenure with Warner Bros. Records, which had just been completed earlier that year. Oddly, this second volume includes "The Apple", which had already been included on the first volume.

Track listing

Side 1
 Two Daughters – 5:16 (from Revenge)
 Toss of the Coin – 2:30 (from Bill Cosby Is a Very Funny Fellow...Right!)
 Conflict – 1:19 (from To Russell, My Brother, Whom I Slept With)
 Dogs and Cats – 2:57 (from 200 M.P.H.)
 Smoking – 2:50 (from Revenge)
 Shop – 2:13 (from Why Is There Air?)

Side 2
 Karate – 5:00 (from ...Right!)
 Oops – 1:48 (from I Started Out as a Child)
 The Apple – 1:43 (from To Russell, My Brother...)
 Hofstra – 8:00 (from Why Is There Air?)

References

1970 greatest hits albums
Bill Cosby compilation albums
Spoken word albums by American artists
Live spoken word albums
Warner Records compilation albums
1970s comedy albums